Guy of Lusignan, Guy of La Marche or Guy of Angoulême or Guy I de Lusignan (c. 1260/1265 – Angoulême, 24 September/28 November 1308 and buried there), Seigneur de Couhé et de Peyrat c. 1282, succeeded his brother Hugh XIII as Seigneur de Lusignan, Count of La Marche and Count of Angoulême on 1 November 1303.
He died unmarried and childless, ending the senior male line of the House of Lusignan (a junior male line through Guy's great-uncle, William de Valence, continued until the death of that man's son, Aymer, in 1324). In spite of this junior male line, Guy was succeeded by his sister Yolande I de Lusignan, except in Angoulême, since after his death it was sold to the French Crown by his sisters Jeanne and Isabelle.

1260s births
1308 deaths
Year of birth uncertain
Counts of Angoulême

Counts of La Marche

Guy I de
13th-century French people
14th-century French people